is a 47 episode animated shōnen mecha television series, and the second series produced for the Eldran franchise funded by Tomy and produced by Sunrise. It aired on TV Tokyo from April 1, 1992, to February 24, 1993. It was the first to introduce helmets, signature colors and signature vehicles.

Plot
Ever since Jin Hyuga, Asuka Tsukishiro and Kouji Hoshiyama had defeated the Evil Empire, peace has returned to Hinobori. In Aozora City (a neighboring town to Hinobori City which Jin and his friends lived), Toubei is trying to train his son Kotaro in the art of the ninja, but a bomb accidentally releases Gokuark, a great demon king of  that Eldran had been keeping contained. Eldran manages to contain him, but one of his servants manages to escape as well, and now attempts to free his master.

Eldran grants the three new mechas named Go Tiger, King Elephant, and Mach Eagle to Kotaro and his two friends, Yosuke and Rikiya, as well as supersuits that grant each of them a superpower.  However, there are also cursed and each of them can turn into a dog when their identity is known to others by a dark wizard, Yaminorius III.

Unless Yaminorius, the Demon Lords and the evil monsters  must be defeated, the  must keep their identities until Gosaurer's debut a year later while Kotaro's father; Toubee has been turned into a dog by the curse.

Characters

Kotaro Kirigakure is the son of a kindergarten principal and a ninja and is also a fourth grader in Aozora Elementary who has a great sense of ability and has a thoughtful of thoughts. He is being trained as a ninja by his father Toubei but he often skips it well. As  with Ganbare Suit, he gains super-speed. His "Ride On" vehicle is the Ganbar Bike, a tiger-motif motorcycle, and he pilots Go Tiger, as well as being the main pilot of Ganbaruger and Great Ganbaruger. Kotaro puts his favorite sweet; banana daifuku ahead of his transformation item, abused his own superpowers at last episode. Unlike his predecessor Jin and later his successor Kenichi, he is a naughty juvenile prankster who always pranks Aozora's population for the fun of it which led to everyone into keeping on hating him even more and more and his mischievousness still never end for his whole life even in his maturity. He's the one resident in Aozora in which everybody hates him the most.

Yousuke Kazamatsuri is the geek/nerd of the group, shy, sometimes unexpected-acting, curious boy whom troubled by his grade-conscious mother, and crush on Yurika, do anything for her. As , he is the first to discover their superpowers in the Ganbare Suits, which in his case is super-senses. he flies the Ganbare Jet (which is actually a prop-driven plane) and Mach Eagle. After he protects the egg containing it, he becomes the pilot of Gekiryuger as well.

Rikiya Ryuzaki is a caring, diligent, loving brother and hard worker that wants to become a professional baseball player. He has the most sense of duty in Gambar team, getting angry with Kotaro's sloppiness. As , Rikiya Ryuzaki gains super-strength. His vehicle is the Ganbar Buggy, which looks like a red go-cart, and like the other two vehicles becomes part of the cockpit for his mech, in this case King Elephant. He is the son of the owner of the ramen restaurant. When anyone needs more help, he ends up becoming the pilot of Revolger as well.

Friends and Allies 
 (Gonzales)

Kotaro's father. Toubei is a great ninja who is ninja dojo's master but no pupils, However, early on Yaminorius turns him into a dog when he attempts to battle him, a form he stays in for most of the rest of the series, called , or Gon for short. Under his doghouse is a secret ninja training chamber. Eventually he is returned to human form in time for the final battle. He had disguised as "Shinobi Ganbar" once, and destroyed Devil Beast as a main pilot of Ganbaruger, Great Ganbaruger instead of Kotaro.

Kotaro's older sister. Kasumi is a strong willed, sense of justice, unyielding 2nd year student in Aozora Junior High who is ace player of badminton club, whom she often fights and argues with the juvenile Kotaro. In episode 33, Kasumi was (accidentally) turned into evil wizard, Kasumirius by the Yaminorius's evil magic once and defeat Yaminorius and fight with Ganbaruger in which she was defeated by the latter and return to normal.

Kotaro and Kasumi's mother. Yayoi is a laid back, gentle principal in Aozora Kindergarten that has been managed, Yayoi and Kasumi believe Toubei went to the training of ninja.

The homeroom teacher of the 4–1 class in Aozora Elementary. Ms. Aiko is a strict teacher but is gentle and loves students, and is a judo master, can fling even a thugs and Makai Beast. On the later, Ms. Aiko fell in love with Mr. Yamino, Yaminorius's human form when he lost memories, she was deeply shocked when his true identity was revealed. However, she decided to make Yaminorius good, to begin persuade Yaminorius with a megaphone to make good him when Yaminorius and Demon Beasts appears.

School newspaper's photographer, Chinatsu wants to be a journalist, is always raving about finding the next "Great Scoop" even though she is only a 4th year elementary student like the Ganbar guys. Chinatsu is a childhood friend of Kotaro and always quarrels with him, but she's Yellow Ganbar's fan since being saved by him.

Yousuke's beloved girl. Yurika is a quiet, serious and ladylike, her home is a hospital, and also has violin lessons with him despite Yousuke's failed attempts at violin.  Yurika has romantic feelings to Blue Ganbar since being saved by him.

The daughter of Defense Force's General Takeda. Katsura is a stubborn, prim, fangirl, and class committee members same with Rikiya. Katsura had hated Ganbar Team, but get soft a little by little since being saved by Red Ganbar. In Nekketsu Saikyo Gosaurer, she appears in a cameo with her father in the Takeda residence.

Rikiya's little brother who is in Aozora Kindergarten and always acted with Akie. Tetsuya respects Rikiya but saying Red Ganbar is cooler than his brother since he saved by him, discouraging Rikiya.

Chinatsu's little sister. Akie wants to be a journalist like her sister, and more reckless than her sister. Akie had combining the Great Ganbaruger only once.

The coach of the Little League Baseball team. He is a student who had failed the entrance exam. Jun has a crush on Aiko Tachibana, had disguised as "White Ganbar" and saved Aiko from Makai Beast. However, he has a broken heart.

Father of Coach Jun, Genzo is an owner of mom-and-pop candy store that suffer with Makai Beast well.

The general of the Defence Force. It seems as if the reason he does not show up as much in Matchless Raijin-Oh is because he was busy over in Aozora City with his daughter and Makaijuu (Hellbeast) attacks. He later returns one last time in Nekketsu Saikyo Gosaurer.

The guardian of the light of earth who gives out Raijin-Oh to Jin Hyuga one year prior. Now, he has entrusted Ganbaruger to the Ganba Team and sealed Gokuark once again. Eldran has sealed Gokuark at 400 years ago prior to Raijin-Oh's appearance and the formation of the Earth Defense Class, and now, he has been fighting against Gokuark but the result is that he had transformed into a white dragon at demon world due to a powerful, evil curse. Later, he would entrust the third Eldran Robo Gosaurer to Kenichi Minezaki and the fourth, Daiteioh to Tarou Oomomo.

Dark sorcerer and servant of Gokurark, also a kind of Demon Beasts. although Gokurark fails his first escape attempt, he slips Yaminorius out to work on freeing him. Yaminorius swears fidelity to demon world, and has greatest magic power but it's spoiled by his blunder and goofy personality. Possessed in a human skeleton model of Aozora Elementary's science prep room usually, will materialize with preparation room's equipments, and put on his head a flask filled with water that's same ingredients with devil world's atmosphere. His human form is young journalist  aka Mr. Yamino mainly. After his master's defeat (since he attacked his master falsely), embeds Gokuark's soul in himself, granting him more power and a slightly altered form. From this point on, until the other two demons free Gokuark from his body and restore Gokuark's power, he is able to convert pre-existing objects directly into Devil Beast. At the later, Yaminorius is loved by Ms. Aiko as human Mr. Yamino when lost memories; he showed own identity after a while, however, to shrink from Ms. Aiko to persuade to trying reform him always. Yaminorius succeeds in the revival of The Three Great Demons; in addition, he finally rebels and helps the Ganbar Team since Gokuaku began to destroy the earth; not rule it, and leaves somewhere after they defeated Three Kings. Yaminorius get away to somewhere, but returned as human Mr. Yamino to Ms. Aiko at ending.

The first of the three demon king of Demon World, originally sealed under a big rock in shrine at hill behind in Aozora City, so want to rules the entire universe. After his initial defeat by the Ganbar Team, he hides himself within Yaminorius, until his revived brothers pull him free once more.

The second of the three demons. He had been sealed by the Christ the Redeemer statue in Rio de Janeiro, Brazil, until Yamino Ryuuse broke the master seal in Japan and freed him and Retsuark. Has control of Lightning.

The last of the three demons. He had been sealed near the Great Pyramids of Giza until freed by the breaking of the combined seal in Japan. Has the power of demon summoning.

Mechanics

Specs
Animal Mode
Length: 20.8 meters
Weight: 18.2 tons
Top Speed: 1,180 kilometers per hour
Power Output: 
Fighter Mode
Height: 16.0 meters
Weight: 18.2 tons
Top Speed: 560 kilometers per hour
Power Output: 

The robot piloted by Yellow Ganbar, Kotaro. It typically launches from either underneath a park, or from a warehouse in a mall. In addition to its claws in beast mode, it has a pair of back cannons(Go Cannon), and fire breath that it only seems to use when executing the team attack Ganbar Ninpo with Mach Eagle and King Elephant.
In robot mode, it wields the Go Saber. It forms the lower torso and upper legs of Ganbaruger.

Specs
Animal Mode
Length: 17.8 meters
Weight: 27.9 tons
Top Speed: 380 kilometers per hour
Power Output: 
Fighter Mode
Height: 15.6 meters
Weight: 35.5 tons
Top Speed: 470 kilometers per hour
Power Output: 

This is Rikiya/Red Ganbar's vehicle. Its main launch points are under an apartment building and under a highway overpass. It has the King Missile in its trunk in beast mode, besides crushing things with its feet, and using its tusks. In robot mode it uses the King Tomahawk. It forms the legs from the knees down of Ganbaruger.

Specs
Animal Mode
Length: 21.5 meters
Weight: 16.8 tons
Ground Movement Speed: 120 kilometers per hour
Top Flying Speed: Mach 9.4
Power Output: 
Fighter Mode
Height: 16.5 meters
Weight: 16.8 tons
Top Speed: 620 kilometers per hour
Power Output: 
The third of the original Ganbare Team robots, controlled by Yousuke aka Blue Ganbar. It can launch from either an intersection, or from under a toll road, just past the toll booths. In beast mode it has vulcans on the wings, and can twirl to create a tornado (Mach Cyclone), which is one of the parts of the Ganbar Ninpo team attack. In robot mode it fires the Mach Arrow. It forms the arms, wings and chest of Ganbaruger.

Specs
Height: 28.4 meters
Weight: 65.7 tons
Ground Movement Speed: 1,880 kilometers per hour
Top Flying Speed: Mach 12.5
Power Output: 
When Koutaro activates the sequence for "" the three above robots combine into Ganbaruger. Its attacks are:
 Ganbar Fire  A stream of fire from the tiger head on the chest
 Ganbar Flare  It is the same as above, but a single ball of fire
 Ganbar Missile  It fires a missile form the trunk on the shield
 Ganbar Slugger  It throws an energy boomerang created from the mohawk on the head
 Ganbar Flasher  Two balls of light come flying from its sides(from the shoulders perhaps) and disintegrate the part of the Makaijuu they hit(arms both times it was used)
 Ganbar Sword  It summons the Ganbare Sword
 Ganbar Final Attack  The finisher. Energy bands launch from the tusks of the shield, holding the enemy in place while the Ganba sword is drawn out of the ground, after which it ignites. Ganbaruger then jets forward and cuts the Makaijuu into quarters, and after it explodes, extinguishes the sword with the shield's tusks.

Specs
Animal Mode
Length: 29.9 meters
Weight: 56.4 tons
Ground Movement Speed: 2,480 kilometers per hour
Top Flying Speed: Mach 10.2
Power Output: 
Fighter Mode
Height: 25.6 meters
Weight: 47.8 tons
Top Speed: 1,540 kilometers per hour
Power Output: 
The first of the two reinforcements. Its transforming command is "", as opposed to the "Miracle Change" of the previous robots(although later on they do use Miracle Change for it a few times). Its pilot is Red Ganbare, and the cockpit is close to what Rikiya is used to in King Elephant. It launches from underneath a railroad crossing. In beast mode it can use its claws and teeth to attack, as well as fire shots form the tail, and in robot mode it has:
 Head Bomber  It fires shots from the "revolver" in the head
 Shot Blaster  It fires blasts from its rifle

The gun mode. When the command "Miracle Bussou"is given, it transforms into a huge double-barrel gun. This mode is called the RevolBuster, and used for the finisher RevolBuster Last Fire.

Specs
Animal Mode
Length: 24.8 meters
Weight: 94.9 tons
Ground Movement Speed: 240 kilometers per hour
Top Flying Speed: Mach 15.4
Power Output: 
Fighter Mode
Height: 27.8 meters
Weight: 60.8 tons
Ground Movement Speed: 1,940 kilometers per hour
Top Flying Speed: Mach 15.4
Power Output: 
Gekiryuger is the last of the reinforcements, granted to Yuusuke. Besides its natural weapons it can fire shots from the tailguns(Back Shot) and duplicate the tornado that Mach Eagle creates(Gekiryu Hurricane). After it transforms with Miracle Henkei(and also Change later):
 Dragon Shot  It summons and fires shots from its handheld rifle
 Gekiryu Cannon  The first part of the major attack(and sometimes finisher). It summons two over-the-shoulder cannons and starts charging an energy blast between them.
 Dragon Thunder Crash  The second part of the major attack. It launches the generated plasma ball at the enemy with a blast from the dragon head on the chest.
 There is also a nameless energy boomerang launched from the head crest.
 It can also join hands with Revolger and Ganbaruger for a team attack and part-time finisher called Ultra Ganbare Ninpo. They become a wheel of flame and roll through the enemy.

Specs
Height: 43.8 meters
Weight: 168.5 tons
Ground Movement Speed: 3,800 kilometers per hour
Top Flying Speed: Mach 32
Power Output: 
The final form. The main torso is Ganbaruger, though Revolger adds onto it, and forms the head, and lower arms at least. Gekiryuger becomes the legs, and wings. Its attacks are:
 Ganbar Breast Flash  It fires an energy blast shaped like the symbol on its chest from its chest at the enemy.
 Final Ganbar Sword  It summons the sword from a pillar of light between earth and sky. Note: It seems as if it can barely handle the weight of the sword!
 Great Final Attack  The finishing move, firing an electric blast form the sword to immobilize the enemy, then jet forward and slash it in half.
 It can also swap the hand for a cannon and fire in a nameless attack.

List of episodes

Translation 
This series was dubbed into English and was part of Cartoon Network's lineup in the Philippines.  The only commercially available release of this English dub is a licensed set of four VCD boxsets which include the original Japanese track as well.

Game Appearances 
Ganbaruger appeared in the Super Robot Wars video game series by Bandai Namco and Banpresto, starting with Super Robot Wars NEO for the Wii, along with the other 3 Eldran robots.

References 
 http://www.starfox.net/hangar/eldoran/GBRobo.html

External links 

 Eldran Official Website (Japanese)
 Sunrise's Information Page (Japanese)

1992 anime television series debuts
Children's manga
Ninja in anime and manga
School life in anime and manga
Sunrise (company)
Eldran series
TV Tokyo original programming
Super robot anime and manga
Tomy games
Super Robot Wars